Lance Farm is a historic farm complex located at Lyme in Jefferson County, New York. The complex includes the farmhouse, a cattle barn, horse barn, a granary, forge, and milkhouse.  The farmhouse was built in 1908 and is a large -story light-wood-frame building on a limestone foundation.  The granary, forge, and milkhouse date to the 1850s.

It was listed on the National Register of Historic Places in 1990.

References

Farms on the National Register of Historic Places in New York (state)
Houses completed in 1908
Houses in Jefferson County, New York
National Register of Historic Places in Jefferson County, New York
1908 establishments in New York (state)